Columbus Downtown High School is a public high school and vocational school located in the downtown area of Columbus, Ohio. It is a part of Columbus City Schools. It was built to consolidate, along with the existing Fort Hayes Career Center, three closing career centers (Northeast Career Center, Northwest Career Center, & Southeast Career Center) in the Columbus City Schools district. While a career center, it also functions as a high school with a capacity of 800 students.

Construction on the school was completed in December 2008. The first classes were held on January 5, 2009 with 200 students.

Programs
Columbus Downtown High School provides the following career paths for students:
 Business and Entrepreneurship
 Financial Services
 Information Technology
 Interactive Multimedia
 Computer Programming
 Law Enforcement
 Criminal Justice
 Cosmetology
 Culinary Arts
 Teaching Academy
 Early Childhood Education
 Engineering Design
 Industrial Technology
 Manufacturing Operations

External links
 School Website
 Columbus City Schools Technical Center Guide

High schools in Columbus, Ohio
Educational institutions established in 2009
Public high schools in Ohio
Buildings in downtown Columbus, Ohio
2009 establishments in Ohio